Jarosław Białek  (born 22 February 1981 in Więcbork) is a Polish football manager and former player, currently in charge of IV liga club Włocłavia Włocławek.

Career

Club
In 2008, he moved to St. Patrick's Athletic F.C. of the League of Ireland Premier Division. He previously had played for Polish side Zagłębie Sosnowiec.

In February 2011, he joined Olimpia Grudziądz on a half-year contract.

References

External links
 Jarosław Białek Interview
 

1981 births
Living people
People from Więcbork
Sportspeople from Kuyavian-Pomeranian Voivodeship
Polish footballers
Association football midfielders
Zawisza Bydgoszcz players
Lech Poznań players
Aluminium Konin players
Kujawiak Włocławek players
Widzew Łódź players
Górnik Zabrze players
Zagłębie Sosnowiec players
Resovia (football) players
St Patrick's Athletic F.C. players
Podbeskidzie Bielsko-Biała players
KSZO Ostrowiec Świętokrzyski players
Olimpia Grudziądz players
Elana Toruń players
Ekstraklasa players
I liga players
II liga players
League of Ireland players
Polish football managers
Polish expatriate footballers
Expatriate association footballers in the Republic of Ireland
Polish expatriate sportspeople in Ireland